The 2009–10 Detroit Red Wings season was the team's 84th season of play for the franchise (78th as the Detroit Red Wings). The Red Wings once again qualified for the Stanley Cup playoffs, but lost in the Western Conference Semifinal.

Regular season 
During the regular season, the Red Wings were shut-out an NHL-high nine times. They also tied the Calgary Flames for the fewest shorthanded goals allowed, with just one.

October 
As part of the NHL Premiere, the Red Wings began their season on Friday, October 2 in Stockholm, Sweden, against the St. Louis Blues. Their home opener was on October 8 against the Chicago Blackhawks.

2009–10 season standings

Divisional standings

Conference standings

Game log 

|- style="background-color:#ffbbbb"
| 1 || October 2 || Detroit || 3 – 4 || St. Louis || || Osgood || 13,850 || 0–1–0 || 0
|- style="background-color:#ffbbbb"
| 2 || October 3 || St. Louis || 5 – 3 || Detroit || || Howard || 13,850 || 0–2–0 || 0
|- style="background-color:#ccffcc"
| 3 || October 8 || Chicago || 2 – 3 || Detroit || || Osgood || 20,066 || 1–2–0 || 2
|- style="background-color:#ccffcc"
| 4 || October 10 || Washington || 2 – 3 || Detroit || || Osgood || 19,122 || 2–2–0 || 4
|- style="background-color:#ffbbbb"
| 5 || October 13 || Detroit || 2 – 6 || Buffalo || || Osgood || 17,459 || 2–3–0 || 4
|- style="background-color:#ccffcc"
| 6 || October 15 || Los Angeles || 2 – 5 || Detroit || || Osgood || 17,782 || 3–3–0 || 6
|- style="background-color:#ffffff"
| 7 || October 17 || Colorado || 4 – 3 || Detroit || SO || Osgood || 19,763 || 3–3–1 || 7
|- style="background-color:#ffffff"
| 8 || October 22 || Detroit || 2 – 3 || Phoenix || OT || Osgood || 11,938 || 3–3–2 || 8
|- style="background-color:#ffbbbb"
| 9 || October 24 || Detroit || 1 – 3 || Colorado || || Howard || 17,690 || 3–4–2 || 8
|- style="background-color:#ccffcc"
| 10 || October 27 || Detroit || 5 – 4 || Vancouver || || Howard || 18,810 || 4–4–2 || 10
|- style="background-color:#ffffff"
| 11 || October 29 || Detroit || 5 – 6 || Edmonton || SO || Howard || 16,839 || 4–4–3 || 11
|- style="background-color:#ccffcc"
| 12 || October 31 || Detroit || 3 – 1 || Calgary || || Osgood || 19,289 || 5–4–3 || 13
|-
| colspan=10 | 
 Played at Ericsson Globe in Stockholm, Sweden as part of the NHL Premiere.

|- style="background-color:#ccffcc"
| 13 || November 3 || Boston || 0 – 2 || Detroit || || Osgood || 19,167 || 6–4–3 || 15
|- style="background-color:#ccffcc"
| 14 || November 5 || San Jose || 1 – 2 || Detroit || SO || Osgood || 19,558 || 7–4–3 || 17
|- style="background-color:#ffbbbb"
| 15 || November 7 || Detroit || 1 – 5 || Toronto || || Osgood || 19,303 || 7–5–3 || 17
|- style="background-color:#ccffcc"
| 16 || November 11 || Detroit || 9 – 1 || Columbus || || Howard || 15,304 || 8–5–3 || 19
|- style="background-color:#ccffcc"
| 17 || November 12 || Vancouver || 1 – 3 || Detroit || || Howard || 20,066 || 9–5–3 || 21
|- style="background-color:#ccffcc"
| 18 || November 14 || Anaheim || 4 – 7 || Detroit || || Howard || 20,066 || 10–5–3 || 23
|- style="background-color:#ffbbbb"
| 19 || November 18 || Dallas || 3 – 1 || Detroit || || Howard || 18,112 || 10–6–3 || 23
|- style="background-color:#ffffff"
| 20 || November 20 || Florida || 2 – 1 || Detroit || OT || Osgood || 18,634 || 10–6–4 || 24
|- style="background-color:#ccffcc"
| 21 || November 21 || Detroit || 3 – 2 || Montreal || SO || Howard || 21,273 || 11–6–4 || 26
|- style="background-color:#ffbbbb"
| 22 || November 23 || Detroit || 1 – 3 || Nashville || || Osgood || 14,410 || 11–7–4 || 26
|- style="background-color:#ffbbbb"
| 23 || November 25 || Atlanta || 2 – 0 || Detroit || || Howard || 20,066 || 11–8–4 || 26
|- style="background-color:#ffbbbb"
| 24 || November 27 || Calgary || 3 – 0 || Detroit || || Osgood || 20,066 || 11–9–4 || 26
|- style="background-color:#ccffcc"
| 25 || November 28 || Detroit || 4 – 3 || St. Louis || SO || Howard || 19,150 || 12–9–4 || 28
|- style="background-color:#ccffcc"
| 26 || November 30 || Dallas || 1 – 4 || Detroit || || Howard || 17,645 || 13–9–4 || 30

|- style="background-color:#ffbbbb"
| 27 || December 3 || Edmonton || 4 – 1 || Detroit || || Howard || 18,018 || 13–10–4 || 30
|- style="background-color:#ffffff"
| 28 || December 5 || Detroit || 3 – 4 || New Jersey || SO || Osgood || 17,625 || 13–10–5 || 31
|- style="background-color:#ccffcc"
| 29 || December 6 || Detroit || 3 – 1 || NY Rangers || || Howard || 18,200 || 14–10–5 || 33
|- style="background-color:#ffbbbb"
| 30 || December 9 || St. Louis || 1 – 0 || Detroit || || Howard || 18,165 || 14–11–5 || 33
|- style="background-color:#ccffcc"
| 31 || December 11 || Anaheim || 2 – 3 || Detroit || OT || Howard || 20,066 || 15–11–5 || 35
|- style="background-color:#ccffcc"
| 32 || December 12 || Detroit || 3 – 2 || Nashville || OT || Osgood || 16,673 || 16–11–5 || 37
|- style="background-color:#ccffcc"
| 33 || December 14 || Phoenix || 2 – 3 || Detroit || || Howard || 18,795 || 17–11–5 || 39
|- style="background-color:#ccffcc"
| 34 || December 17 || Tampa Bay || 0 – 3 || Detroit || || Howard || 19,474 || 18–11–5 || 41
|- style="background-color:#ffbbbb"
| 35 || December 19 || Detroit || 3 – 4 || Dallas || || Howard || 18,532 || 18–12–5 || 41
|- style="background-color:#ffbbbb"
| 36 || December 20 || Detroit || 0 – 3 || Chicago || || Osgood || 21,781 || 18–13–5 || 41
|- style="background-color:#ffbbbb"
| 37 || December 23 || Chicago || 3 – 0 || Detroit || || Howard || 20,066 || 18–14–5 || 41
|- style="background-color:#ccffcc"
| 38 || December 26 || Columbus || 1 – 2 || Detroit || || Howard || 20,066 || 19–14–5 || 43
|- style="background-color:#ffffff"
| 39 || December 28 || Detroit || 0 – 1 || Columbus || OT || Howard || 18,421 || 19–14–6 || 44
|- style="background-color:#ccffcc"
| 40 || December 31 || Colorado || 2 – 4 || Detroit || || Howard || 20,066 || 20–14–6 || 46

|- style="background-color:#ccffcc"
| 41 || January 2 || Detroit || 4 – 1 || Phoenix || || Howard || 17,125 || 21–14–6 || 48
|- style="background-color:#ffbbbb"
| 42 || January 5 || Detroit || 1 – 4 || Anaheim || || Howard || 15,531 || 21–15–6 || 48
|- style="background-color:#ccffcc"
| 43 || January 7 || Detroit || 2 – 1 || Los Angeles || || Howard || 18,118 || 22–15–6 || 50
|- style="background-color:#ccffcc"
| 44 || January 9 || Detroit || 4 – 1 || San Jose || || Howard || 17,562 || 23–15–6 || 52
|- style="background-color:#ffbbbb"
| 45 || January 12 || Detroit || 0 – 6 || NY Islanders || || Howard || 12,254 || 23–16–6 || 52
|- style="background-color:#ccffcc"
| 46 || January 14 || Carolina || 1 – 3 || Detroit || || Howard || 20,066 || 24–16–6 || 54
|- style="background-color:#ffffff"
| 47 || January 16 || Detroit || 2 – 3 || Dallas || SO || Howard || 18,532 || 24–16–7 || 55
|- style="background-color:#ffffff"
| 48 || January 17 || Chicago || 4 – 3 || Detroit || SO || Howard || 20,066 || 24–16–8 || 56
|- style="background-color:#ffbbbb"
| 49 || January 19 || Detroit || 2 – 3 || Chicago || || Osgood || 18,277 || 24–17–8 || 56
|- style="background-color:#ccffcc"
| 50 || January 21 || Detroit || 4 – 3 || Minnesota || SO || Howard || 18,330 || 25–17–8 || 58
|- style="background-color:#ffbbbb"
| 51 || January 23 || Los Angeles || 3 – 2 || Detroit || || Howard || 20,066 || 25–18–8 || 58
|- style="background-color:#ffffff"
| 52 || January 26 || Phoenix || 5 – 4 || Detroit || OT || Howard || 19,843 || 25–18–9 || 59
|- style="background-color:#ffbbbb"
| 53 || January 27 || Detroit || 2 – 5 || Minnesota || || Osgood || 18,316 || 25–19–9 || 59
|- style="background-color:#ccffcc"
| 54 || January 29 || Nashville || 2 – 4 || Detroit || || Howard || 20,066 || 26–19–9 || 61
|- style="background-color:#ffffff"
| 55 || January 31 || Detroit || 1 – 2 || Pittsburgh || SO || Howard || 17,105 || 26–19–10 || 62

|- style="background-color:#ccffcc"
| 56 || February 2 || Detroit || 4 – 2 || San Jose || || Howard || 17,562 || 27–19–10 || 64
|- style="background-color:#ffbbbb"
| 57 || February 3 || Detroit || 1 – 3 || Anaheim || || Howard || 15,180 || 27–20–10 || 64
|- style="background-color:#ffbbbb"
| 58 || February 6 || Detroit || 3 - 4 || Los Angeles || || Howard || 18,118 || 27-21-10 || 64
|- style="background-color:#ffffff"
| 59 || February 9 || Detroit || 3 – 4 || St. Louis || SO || Howard || 19,150 || 27–21–11 || 65
|- style="background-color:#ffffff"
| 60 || February 11 || San Jose || 3 – 2 || Detroit || SO || Howard || 20,066 || 27–21–12 || 66
|- style="background-color:#ccffcc"
| 61 || February 13 || Ottawa || 1 – 4 || Detroit || || Howard || 20,066 || 28–21–12 || 68

|- style="background-color:#ccffcc"
| 62 || March 1 || Detroit || 3 – 2 || Colorado || || Howard || 18,007 || 29–21–12 || 70
|- style="background-color:#ffbbbb"
| 63 || March 3 || Vancouver ||6 - 3 || Detroit || || Osgood || 19,536 || 29-22-12 || 70
|- style="background-color:#ccffcc"
| 64 || March 5 || Nashville || 2 - 5 || Detroit || || Howard || 19,608 || 30-22-12 || 72
|- style="background-color:#ccffcc"
| 65 || March 7 || Detroit || 5 - 4 || Chicago || || Howard || 22,309 || 31-22-12 || 74
|- style="background-color:#ffbbbb"
| 66 || March 9 || Calgary || 4 - 2 || Detroit || || Howard || 20,066 || 31-23-12 || 74
|- style="background-color:#ccffcc"
| 67 || March 11 || Minnesota || 1 - 5 || Detroit || || Howard || 19,327 || 32-23-12 || 76
|- style="background-color:#ccffcc"
| 68 || March 13 || Buffalo || 2 - 3 || Detroit || OT || Howard || 20,066 || 33-23-12 || 78
|- style="background-color:#ccffcc"
| 69 || March 15 || Detroit || 3 - 2 || Calgary || || Howard || 19,289 || 34-23-12 || 80
|- style="background-color:#ffffff"
| 70 || March 19 || Detroit || 2 - 3 || Edmonton || SO || Howard || 16,829 || 34-23-13 || 81
|- style="background-color:#ccffcc"
| 71 || March 20 || Detroit || 4 - 3 || Vancouver || OT || Howard || 18,810 || 35-23-13 || 83
|- style="background-color:#ccffcc"
| 72 || March 22 || Pittsburgh || 1 - 3 || Detroit || || Howard || 20,066 || 36-23-13 || 85
|- style="background-color:#ccffcc"
| 73 || March 24 || St. Louis || 2 - 4 || Detroit || || Howard || 19,625 || 37-23-13 || 87
|- style="background-color:#ccffcc"
| 74 || March 26 || Minnesota || 2 - 6 || Detroit || || Howard || 20,066 || 38-23-13 || 89
|- style="background-color:#ccffcc"
| 75 || March 27 || Detroit || 1 - 0 || Nashville || SO || Howard || 17,113 || 39-23-13 || 91
|- style="background-color:#ccffcc"
| 76 || March 30 || Edmonton || 4 - 5 || Detroit || || Howard || 19,343 || 40-23-13 || 93

|- style="background-color:#ccffcc"
| 77 || April 1 || Columbus || 2 - 3 || Detroit || || Howard || 19,259 || 41-23-13 || 95
|- style="background-color:#ffffff"
| 78 || April 3 || Nashville || 4 - 3 || Detroit || OT || Howard || 20,066 || 41-23-14 || 96
|- style="background-color:#ffbbbb"
| 79 || April 4 || Detroit || 3 - 4 || Philadelphia || || Howard || 19,596 || 41-24-14 || 96
|- style="background-color:#ccffcc"
| 80 || April 7 || Columbus || 3 - 4 || Detroit || || Howard || 20,066 || 42-24-14 || 98
|- style="background-color:#ccffcc"
| 81 || April 9 || Detroit || 1 - 0 || Columbus || SO || Howard || 18,512 || 43-24-14 || 100
|- style="background-color:#ccffcc"
| 82 || April 11 || Detroit || 3 - 2 || Chicago || OT || Howard || 22,428 || 44-24-14 || 102

|-
|Legend:

Playoffs 

As of the conclusion of the previous season, the Red Wings have made the Stanley Cup playoffs for 18 consecutive seasons, the longest current post-season streak for a single team in all of North American major professional sports. , the Red Wings have made the playoffs for 19 consecutive seasons.

|- style="background:#FFBBBB"
| 1 || Apr 14 || Detroit || 2 – 3 || Coyotes || || Howard || 17,125 || 0–1
|- style="background:#CCFFCC"
| 2 || Apr 16 || Detroit || 7 – 4 || Coyotes || || Howard || 17,386 || 1–1
|- style="background:#FFBBBB"
| 3 || Apr 18 || Coyotes || 4 – 2 || Detroit || || Howard || 20,066 || 1–2
|- style="background:#CCFFCC"
| 4 || Apr 20 || Coyotes || 0 – 3 || Detroit || || Howard || 20,066 || 2–2
|- style="background:#CCFFCC"
| 5 || Apr 23 || Detroit || 4 – 1 || Coyotes || || Howard || 17,458 || 3–2
|- style="background:#FFBBBB"
| 6 || Apr 25 || Coyotes || 5 – 2 || Detroit || || Howard || 20,066 || 3–3
|- style="background:#CCFFCC"
| 7 || Apr 27 || Detroit || 6 – 1 || Coyotes || || Howard || 17,543 || 4–3

|- style="background:#FFBBBB"
| 1 || Apr 29 || Detroit || 3 – 4 || Sharks || || Howard || 17,562 || 0–1
|- style="background:#FFBBBB"
| 2 || May 2 || Detroit || 3 – 4 || Sharks || || Howard || 17,562 || 0–2
|- style="background:#FFBBBB"
| 3 || May 4 || Sharks || 4 – 3 || Detroit || OT || Howard || 20,066 || 0–3
|- style="background:#CCFFCC"
| 4 || May 6 || Sharks || 1 – 7 || Detroit || || Howard || 20,066 || 1–3
|- style="background:#FFBBBB"
| 5 || May 8 || Detroit || 1 – 2 || Sharks || || Howard || 17,562 || 1–4

|-
| Legend:

Player statistics

Skaters 
Note: GP = Games played; G = Goals; A = Assists; Pts = Points; +/− = Plus/minus; PIM = Penalty minutes

Goaltenders 
Note: GP = Games played; TOI = Time on ice (minutes); W = Wins; L = Losses; OT = Overtime losses; GA = Goals against; SO = Shutouts; Sv% = Save percentage; GAA = Goals against average

†Denotes player spent time with another team before joining Red Wings. Stats reflect time with the Red Wings only.
‡Traded mid-season
Bold/italics denotes franchise record

Awards and records

Records

Milestones

Awards

Transactions 
The Red Wings were involved in the following transactions during the 2009–10 season.

Trades

Free agents acquired

Free agents lost

Claimed via waivers

Lost via waivers

Lost via retirement

Player signings

Draft picks 

The 2009 NHL Entry Draft was held in Montreal, Quebec, on June 26–27, 2009. Detroit made following picks:

See also 
 2009–10 NHL season

Farm teams 
The Grand Rapids Griffins remain Detroit's American Hockey League affiliate in 2009–10 and the Toledo Walleye will become the team's ECHL affiliate in 2009-10.

References

External links 
 2009–10 Detroit Red Wings season at ESPN
 2009–10 Detroit Red Wings season at Hockey Reference

Detroit Red Wings seasons
Detroit Red Wings season, 2009-10
Detroit
Detroit Red
Detroit Red